Hycan is a brand by GAC-Nio New Energy Technology Co., Ltd., a joint venture between Chinese automobile manufacturers GAC Group and Nio Inc., founded in April 2019 to produce electric vehicles.

History
On 10 April 2018, GAC Group and Nio Inc. established a joint venture called GAC-Nio New Energy Technology Co., Ltd., and almost a year later on 1 April 2019, GAC and Nio announced the upcoming revealing of a new brand and electric SUV under this joint venture.

In early 2021, Nio's stake in Hycan was diluted to 4.5% and by August 2021, announced intentions to develop its own entry-level brand, putting the company's future involvement in Hycan into question.

Models

Hycan 007

The Hycan 007 is a mid-size electric Sport utility vehicle produced since April 2020.

On 20 May 2019, Hycan revealed the 007 concept, an Aion LX (produced by GAC New Energy) with a redesigned front and rear end, interior, and wheel design. The production model was yet to be revealed and multiple teasers were shown before the upcoming revealing.

On 27 December 2019, the largely unchanged production Hycan 007 was revealed and went on pre-sale before being officially listed for sale in the Chinese market in April 2020 at a starting price of 262,000 Chinese yuan (37,343 USD).

The 007 is available in three trim levels, Base, Plus, and Top.

Hycan Z03

The Hycan Z03 is a subcompact electric crossover sport utility vehicle produced in China since April 2021, where it is also known as the Hechuang Z03. The Z03, is an Aion Y with a redesigned front and rear end, interior, and wheel design.

Hycan A06
The Hycan A06 is a mid-size electric sedan launched in 2022.

Technologies

'Little Can' AI 

Hycan vehicles feature a smart assistance similar to Nio's Nomi smart assistant. The assistant, named 'Little Can' (in Chinese, 小CAN, pronounced Xiǎo Cān) can pull up the cars navigation, control the music, adjust the cabin temperature, open or close windows and take a selfie of the passengers in the cabin.

References

Vehicle manufacturing companies established in 2019
GAC Group divisions and subsidiaries
Electric vehicle manufacturers of China
NIO (car company)